Zigomar was a Serbian adventure comic strip created in 1939 by Nikola Navojev and Branko Vidić.

Zigomar may also refer to:

 Zigomar, an alias for a character in the Filipino film Tatlong Baraha